Hussein Moussawi (born 1943 in Al-Nabi Shayth) is a Shia Lebanese politician who is a member of the Hezbollah. Boaz Ganor and Miri Halperin Wernli argue that in 2006 Moussawi and his brother Hashem Moussawi involved in the making of the exact copies of Captagon which they distributed to the Arab world.

Hussein Moussawi served in the Lebanese Parliament representing the Baalbeck/Hermil district. As of 2010 he was part of Lebanon's Loyalty to the Resistance bloc in the Parliament.

See also
 Members of the 2009-2013 Lebanese Parliament

References

1943 births
Living people
Members of the Parliament of Lebanon
Lebanese Shia Muslims
Hezbollah politicians
People from Baalbek District
Beirut Arab University alumni